Aristides Azevedo Pacheco Leão (August 3, 1914 in Rio de Janeiro – December 14, 1993 in São Paulo) was a Brazilian neurophysiologist, researcher and university professor.

Leão discovered and described the spreading depression, which also became known as "the Leão wave". This depression is a reaction in the cerebral cortex that can be induced by touch or electric shock, although, more significantly, it occurs spontaneously in migraine and to some extent in epilepsy. It occurs not only in the brain, but in other neural structures.

Leão was president of the Brazilian Academy of Sciences between 1967 and 1981 and defended scientists persecuted by the military dictatoship, besides having created scientific publications and having closed important scientific collaborations of the academy. Elected president emeritus of the institution, the academy's library now bears his name. He was awarded the Grand Cross of the National Order of Scientific Merit and was a full member of the Brazilian Academy of Sciences.

Biography
Leão was born on August 3, 1914, into a traditional family in Rio de Janeiro, the youngest of seven siblings. He never met his father, Manoel Pacheco Leão, who died shortly before Leão was born. His mother, the painter Francisca Azevedo Leão, raised the children alone, with the help of her brother-in-law, the biologist and director of the Rio de Janeiro Botanical Garden, Antônio Pacheco Leão, who assisted in the children's education. While living in a large house in the Laranjeiras neighborhood, the family was also helped by a British nanny of whom no records exist.

Leão entered the São Paulo School of Medicine in 1932 at the age of 18. However, he contracted tuberculosis in his second year and had to suspend his studies for two years, while being treated in Belo Horizonte. When he recovered, he decided that he would like to work in scientific research and moved to the United States in 1941, where he was admitted to the graduate research program at Harvard Medical School. He received his master's degree in 1942 and his doctorate of science in 1943.

Career

In 1943, he became an adjunct researcher at Harvard's Department of Anatomy, where he identified the phenomenon of spreading depression, and although he had the opportunity to work in the United States, he preferred to return to Brazil in 1944, at the age of 32. Upon his return, he was appointed Specialized Technician of the Chair of Biological Physics (1945) at the National School of Medicine of the Federal University of Rio de Janeiro.

He was invited by Carlos Chagas Filho, to join the new Biophysics Institute, which was still being organized. His colleagues included Gustavo de Oliveira Castro. The instruments in his laboratory in Brazil were salvaged discards, but they were so carefully restored that they were always ready for use. Despite discouraging practical limitations, he did not abandon his work and so published his first article in Brazil. His first article on spreading depression, 'Spreading depression of electrical activity in the cerebral cortex,' the phenomenon was given the eponym of his name and called Leão's spreading depression.

Leão was director of the institute from 1966 to 1970 and emeritus head of the neurobiology department from 1984 to 1993. He became an associate of the Brazilian Academy of Sciences (1948) and a full member in 1951, and was its vice-president (1955-1957/1965-1967) and president for seven consecutive terms (1967-1981). He was a member of the Deliberative Council at CNPq (1960–74) and then its scientific advisor (1975–84). During the Brazilian military dictatorship, as President of the ABC, he also defended the Revista Brasileira de Biologia (Brazilian Journal of Biology) after its editors were arrested by the regime. While president he also encouraged scientific cooperation between Brazil and other countries.

After the cesium leak in Goiânia, in 1988, he became the president of the newly created State Commission of Radioprotection and Nuclear Safety. Between 1985 and 1991 he participated in the Planning and Science and Technology Secretariats of the Presidency of the Republic, as member and president of the Special Followup Group (GEA) of the Scientific Development Support Program (PADCT).

After his mandatory retirement, he was named Laboratory Head Emeritus of the Department of Neurobiology of the Carlos Chagas Filho Biophysics Institute, where he remained for nine more years as a CNPq research fellow.

Leão's Wave

Aristides Leão discovered the phenomenon while working on his thesis at Harvard in 1944. He named the phenomenon "spreading depression", but it became known as "the Leão's wave". The true causes of this depression are not known, but it can be induced by electric shocks. The description of this illness helped in the diagnosis of other diseases such as epilepsy. According to Leão's later investigations, it occurs not only in the brain, but also in other neural structures. His research on spreading depression is still widely cited within the medical literature and the spreading depression, in the case of brain damage, can be reversed provided that the blood flow is restored quickly. However, there is no guarantee that the neurons may survive.

History of Discovery
The earliest origin of what has come to be known as spreading depression dates back to 1906, when Sir. William Richard Gowers, in a lecture on epilepsy, noted that “a peculiar spreading disturbance of the nerve structures is evident” and that lasts for several minutes, something that was confirmed and described by Aristides Leão in this way:

While working on his PhD thesis at Harvard under the supervision of Hallowell Davis, Leão aimed to study "experimental "epilepsy". To perform the experiment he opened anesthetized rabbit skulls and placed a row of silver electrodes in contact with the cortical surface, with two serving for stimulation. However, instead of a seizure-like discharge, the stimulation was followed by a flattening of the brain waves in a kind of domino effect, which recovered in the same way.

 questions whether the ease with which this phenomenon can be caused did not cause other researchers to have observed it before Leão and dismissed it as an "annoying interruption of work" and goes on to say that this phenomenon intrigued him and became the main topic of Aristides' work, with his first article  demonstrating the basic characteristics that have been confirmed by other researchers. In a following article  he described how blood vessels behave during the event.

Over the years other articles on the subject have been done, but it is still not understood why the spreading depression occurs.

Awards
The researcher is also remembered for his outstanding performance as president of the Brazilian Academy of Sciences between 1967 and 1981. He also received posthumous tribute from the Brazilian Academy of Sciences, whose library today bears his name, being elected president emeritus of this institution on December 20, 1993.

Death
Leão died on December 14, 1993, in São Paulo, at the age of 79, due to respiratory failure. He was buried in Rio de Janeiro, in the family grave.

Legacy
According to Rodrigo Polito at Uol, Leão is the author of one of the most cited physiology articles in the world and dedicated his life to the development of science in his native country. Carlos Chagas Filho described him as "...one of the greatest scientists I knew, he was extremely simple and cultured, a great stimulator of research among young people and an exceptional professor of general and comparative physiology..." who left a great number of disciples in Brazil and abroad, besides having had a great influence on the projection of the Institute of Biophysics as an institution of excellence abroad.

In 2002 it was demonstrated that depolarization occurs in human brains and in 2018, the article "Terminal spreading depolarization and electrical silence in death of human cerebral cortex", published in Annals of Neurology, for the first time revealed that the spreading depression described by Leão occurs in the human brain after the end of cardiac activity. In a possible coincidence, co-author Jed Hartings discovered that the series Star Trek: The Next Generation had laid out this process in general form in the episode Skin of Evil in much the same way as the 2018 research, which leads co-researcher Jens Dreier to believe that the scriptwriters may have borrowed from similar research (or even Leão's).

Personal life
Leão enjoyed sport fishing, classical composers, Brazilian popular music and being considered by his colleagues as having a "prodigious culture", his ornithology collection surpassed that of the National Museum, although he considered himself an amateur in the field. In doing so, he also developed as a naturalist and had in Charles Darwin his main reference. He also behaved as a humble person, despite his academic position and achievements.  considers Aristides to be the father of bioacoustics in Brazil.

Scientific papers

See also
 Neuroscience
 Migraine
 Headache

References

Note

Bibliography

 (Internet Archive)

External links

        
        
        
        
        

1914 births
1993 deaths
20th-century Brazilian scientists
Neurophysiologists
20th-century physicians
Recipients of the Great Cross of the National Order of Scientific Merit (Brazil)
University of São Paulo alumni
Harvard Medical School alumni
Members of the Brazilian Academy of Sciences
Academic staff of the Federal University of Rio de Janeiro
Deaths from respiratory failure
Brazilian neuroscientists
People from Rio de Janeiro (city)
People associated with Federal University of Rio de Janeiro